Michael Jeffrey Aminoff (born 1941 in Little Paxton, England) is a clinical neurologist and neurophysiologist whose work currently focuses on treating Parkinson's disease and related movement disorders. He lives in San Francisco, California.

Biography
Aminoff is a clinical neurologist and neurophysiologist, clinical investigator, university professor, author, and editor with a special interest in medical history. He was born and educated in England, graduating from University College London in 1962 and as a physician from University College Hospital Medical School in 1965. He subsequently trained in neurology and neurophysiology at The National Hospital (Queen Square) in London, and moved to San Francisco in 1976 where he has been Professor of Neurology since 1982 at the School of Medicine of the University of California, San Francisco (UCSF). He was Director of UCSF's Clinical Neurophysiology Laboratories until 2004. Aminoff currently directs UCSF's Parkinson's Disease Clinic and Research Center, a National Parkinson Foundation Center of Excellence.

Aminoff has received numerous honors and awards for his work as an educator and neurologist, including the Lifetime Achievement Award from the American Association of Neuromuscular & Electrodiagnostic Medicine in 2006, and the 2007 A.B. Baker Award of the American Academy of Neurology for lifetime achievements and contributions to medical education. From 2004 to 2012 he was a director of the American Board of Psychiatry and Neurology, serving as chair of the board in 2011 and in 2010 UCSF awarded him the title of Distinguished Professor. He is a Fellow of the Royal College of Physicians of London as well as of the American Academy of Neurology and the American Neurological Association.

He has authored many medical and scientific papers, particularly on electrophysiological studies of the nervous system in health and disease. His scientific published works earned him a Doctorate in Science, an advanced doctorate in the Faculty of Science from the University of London, in 2000. He has written or edited 40 books, including several comprehensive textbooks that have gone into numerous editions. His published works have been translated into 8 languages. He was editor-in-chief of the neuroscience journal Muscle and Nerve from 1998 to 2007, was one of the two editors-in-chief (along with Robert B. Daroff) of the four-volume Encyclopedia of the Neurological Sciences, and is one of three series editors of the multivolume Handbook of Clinical Neurology published by Elsevier.

Aminoff has a longstanding interest in the history of medicine and is the author of biographies of C.E. Brown-Séquard and Sir Charles Bell. With Larry R. Faulkner he edited a volume on the history of the American Board of Psychiatry and Neurology.

Education and career
Aminoff received a bachelor of science degree from University College London (1962) and his medical degree (M.B., B.S.) from University College Hospital (UCH) Medical School (London) in 1965. After internship at UCH, he trained in internal medicine at various London teaching hospitals, gained membership of the Royal College of Physicians of London (equivalent to obtaining certification in internal medicine in the U.S.) and then trained in neurology and clinical neurophysiology at the Middlesex Hospital and the National Hospitals for Nervous Diseases (Queen Square and Maida Vale) in London. He received his M.D. degree, which in England is awarded for an advanced research thesis, for his experimental studies at the Institute of Neurology (London) on the spinal integration of various inputs to respiratory motor neurons. He subsequently moved to the University of California San Francisco, where he has held various faculty positions in the department of neurology, becoming a full professor in 1982, and was awarded the title of distinguished professor in 2010. He was certified in neurology by the American Board of Psychiatry & Neurology (ABPN) in 1982 (recertified, 2004) and received subspecialty certification in clinical neurophysiology by the ABPN when this new subspecialty was created in 1992 (recertified 2002). In 2000 the University of London awarded him a doctorate in science (a higher doctorate in the faculty of science) for his electrophysiological studies of the nervous system in health and disease.

Research
Aminoff is a clinical neurologist and neurophysiologist whose original contributions have been in several overlapping areas, utilizing electrophysiological techniques to investigate the functioning of the nervous system in health and disease. His work has been directed at extending the clinical applications of electrodiagnostic techniques or at providing insight into the underlying pathophysiology of various disorders. His work on different aspects of the autonomic nervous system showed involvement of sympathetic fibers in entrapment neuropathies; the importance of spinal mechanisms in the control of breathing; the nature and consequences of the dysautonomia occurring in patients with Parkinson’s disease; and the nature of the involuntary motor activity that follows cessation of the cerebral circulation (syncope). His studies of the physiology of sensory discrimination and motor control showed that the discrimination-response system is organized as a parallel network rather than in the serial manner often portrayed, and he provided evidence that the long-latency stretch responses have a transcerebral pathway in humans, are under some degree of voluntary control, and relate to the organization of the discrimination-response system. His studies provided electrophysiological evidence for different types of dementia and defined their electrophysiological characteristics.

Aminoff's clinical studies of spinal vascular malformations (dural arteriovenous fistulas) led to a new theory on their pathophysiology. He and his collaborators suggested that increased venous pressure reduces the intramedullary arteriovenous pressure gradient and thus blood flow, leading to spinal cord ischemia. This is now widely accepted and has had major implications for the treatment of these lesions. His later interest in movement disorders led him to show the utility of botulinum toxin in the treatment of various movement disorders, and then to study gene therapy in managing patients with Parkinson’s disease.

Aminoff has devoted many years to medical education. As a director and chair of the American Board of Clinical Neurophysiology, of the American Board of Electrodiagnostic Medicine, and of the American Board of Psychiatry & Neurology, he was concerned with syllabus development, setting national guidelines and educational standards, and assessing competence in clinical neurophysiology and clinical neurology. He lectures frequently at regional, national and international meetings, has authored or edited numerous books on neurological science and education, and in 2003 was appointed one of the series editors of the Handbook of Clinical Neurology. His teaching contributions have led to several national awards.

Honors and awards
1973Queen Square Prize for Research in Neurology, Institute of Neurology, London, UK
1991Royer Award (Neurology), University of California, San Francisco
2006Lifetime Achievement Award, American Association of Neuromuscular and Electrodiagnostic Medicine
2007A.B. Baker Award, American Academy of Neurology
2010Honorary member, Gold-Headed Cane Society, University of California, San Francisco
2011Awarded title of “Distinguished Professor” at University of California, San Francisco
2013Endowed Chair in Parkinson’s Disease Research, University of California, San Francisco

Books
Aminoff MJ: Spinal Angiomas. Blackwell: Oxford, 1976.

Aminioff MJ: Electromyography in Clinical Practice. Addison Wesley:  Reading, Mass., 1978.

Aminoff MJ (Ed): Electrodiagnosis in Clinical Neurology.  Churchill Livingstone:  New York.
First Edition, 1980; Second Edition, 1986; Third Edition, 1992; Fourth Edition, 1999; Fifth Edition, 2005; Sixth Edition, 2012 (as Aminoff’s Electrodiagnosis in Clinical Neurology)

Consultant in neurology and neurophysiology and Asst. Editor for the Encyclopedia and Dictionary of Laboratory Medicine and Technology, Bennington JL (Ed), Saunders: Philadelphia, 1984.

Aminoff MJ (Ed): Electrodiagnosis issue, Neurologic Clinics. Saunders: Philadelphia, 1985
Portuguese (Brazilian) translation published as a separate book, 1987.

Aminoff MJ: Electromyography in Clinical Practice. Electrodiagnostic Aspects of Neuromuscular Disease. 2nd Edition (expanded). Churchill Livingstone:  NY, 1987
3rd Edition, Churchill Livingstone: NY, 1998

Simon RP, Aminoff MJ, Greenberg DA: Clinical Neurology. Appleton & Lange: Norwalk, 1989.
Second Edition, 1993; Third edition, 1996; Fourth Edition, 1999; Fifth Edition, 2002; Sixth Edition, 2005; Seventh Edition, 2009; Eighth Edition, 2012; Ninth Edition, 2015; Tenth Edition, 2018	
	               
Aminoff MJ (Ed): Neurology and General Medicine. Churchill Livingstone:  New York. First Edition, 1989
Second Edition, 1995; Third Edition, 2001; Fourth Edition, 2008; Fifth Edition, 2014 (with Josephson SA; as Aminoff’s Neurology and General Medicine)

Aminoff MJ: Brown-Séquard: A Visionary of Science. Raven Press, New York, 1993.

Goetz CG, Tanner CM, Aminoff MJ (Eds): Handbook of Clinical Neurology, Volume 63: Systemic Disease, Part 1. Elsevier, Amsterdam, 1993.

Tollerud D, Aminoff MJ, et al: "Veterans and Agent Orange," Update 1996. NAP, Washington, 1996;
Update 1998. NAP, Washington, 1998; Herbicide/Dioxin exposure and type 2 diabetes. NAP, Washington, 2000.

Goetz CG, Aminoff MJ (Eds): Handbook of Clinical Neurology, Volume 70: Systemic Diseases, Part II, Elsevier, Amsterdam, 1998

Aminoff MJ, Goetz CG (Eds): Handbook of Clinical Neurology, Volume 71: Systemic Diseases, Part III, Elsevier, Amsterdam, 1998

Brown WF, Bolton CF, Aminoff MJ (Eds): Neuromuscular Function and Disease: Basic, Clinical and Electrodiagnostic Aspects. 2 Volumes. Saunders, Philadelphia, 2002

Aminoff MJ, Daroff RB (Eds): Encyclopedia of the Neurological Sciences. 4 Volumes.  Academic Press, San Diego, 2003; Second edition, 2014

Aminoff MJ: Brown-Séquard: An Improbable Genius Who Transformed Medicine. Oxford University Press, New York, 2011

Aminoff MJ, Faulkner L (Eds): The American Board of Psychiatry and Neurology: Looking Back and Moving Ahead. American Psychiatric Publishing, Washington, DC, 2012

Jones HR, Burns TM, Aminoff MJ, Pomeroy SL (Eds): The Netter Collection of Medical Illustrations, 2nd Edition. Volume 7: The Nervous System. (In two volumes or parts). Elsevier Saunders, Philadelphia, 2013

Aminoff MJ: Sir Charles Bell: His Life, Art, Neurological Concepts, and Controversial Legacy. Oxford University Press, New York, 2017

Television appearances
Parkinson's Disease: A Dose of Hope. Program on Parkinson’s disease for patients and caregivers produced by UCTV and aired nationally for 1 week in 2011. Continues to be available on websites for UCTV, YouTube, and the UCSF PD Center.
Parkinson's: Latest from the Experts. Program on Parkinson’s disease for health-care professionals produced by UCTV and aired nationally for 1 week in 2011. Continues to be available on websites for UCTV, YouTube, and the UCSF PD Center.

References

External links
 UCSF Parkinson's Disease Clinic and Research Center

Alumni of the University of London
Living people
British medical historians
University of California, San Francisco faculty
University of California, San Francisco staff
British neurologists
1941 births
Fellows of the Royal College of Physicians
People from Cambridgeshire
British expatriate academics in the United States